The 2017–18 Slovenian Third League was the 26th edition of the Slovenian Third League. The season began on 19 August 2017 and ended on 27 May 2018.

Competition format and rules
The 2017–18 Slovenian Third League was divided into four regional groups with a total of 50 participating clubs. The three groups (North, Centre, East) were composed of 14 clubs, while the West group consisted of 8 clubs. The winners of the regular season in each group played a promotional two-legged play-off to decide the two teams promoting to the Slovenian Second League.

3. SNL Centre

Clubs

League table

3. SNL East

Clubs

League table

1 Rakičan was denied licence.

3. SNL North

Clubs

League table

3. SNL West

Clubs

League table

Play-offs 
A two-legged play-offs between the group winners for promotion to the 2018–19 Slovenian Second League.

First leg

Second leg

See also
2017–18 Slovenian PrvaLiga
2017–18 Slovenian Second League

References

External links
Football Association of Slovenia 

3
Slovenian Third League, 2017-18
Slovenian Third League seasons